Macy is an unincorporated village in Franklin County, Maine, United States.

Notes

Villages in Franklin County, Maine
Villages in Maine